Harry Potter and the Prisoner of Azkaban is a fantasy novel written by British author J. K. Rowling and is the third in the Harry Potter series. The book follows Harry Potter, a young wizard, in his third year at Hogwarts School of Witchcraft and Wizardry. Along with friends Ronald Weasley and Hermione Granger, Harry investigates Sirius Black, an escaped prisoner from Azkaban, the wizard prison, believed to be one of Lord Voldemort's old allies.

The book was published in the United Kingdom on 8 July 1999 by Bloomsbury and in the United States on 8 September 1999 by Scholastic, Inc. Rowling found the book easy to write, finishing it just a year after she began writing it. The book sold 68,000 copies in just three days after its release in the United Kingdom and since has sold over three million in the country. The book won the 1999 Whitbread Children's Book Award, the Bram Stoker Award, and the 2000 Locus Award for Best Fantasy Novel and was short-listed for other awards, including the Hugo.

The film adaptation of the novel was released in 2004, grossing more than $796 million and earning critical acclaim. Video games loosely based on Harry Potter and the Prisoner of Azkaban were also released for several platforms, and most obtained favourable reviews.

Plot
While Harry is living with the Dursleys, Aunt Marge comes to visit. When Harry and his late parents are insulted by Marge, Harry gets aggressive and accidentally inflates her. Harry packs up his stuff and leaves the house, choosing to spend the summer at the Leaky Cauldron inn in London. While there, Harry is warned that a former follower of Voldemort, named Sirius Black, is seeking him out after having escaped from the wizard prison, Azkaban.

At Hogwarts, the guards of Azkaban, known as the Dementors, patrol the school looking for Black. Harry is unusually affected by their presence, and asks help from Remus Lupin, the new Defence Against the Dark Arts teacher, in learning to repel them. Lupin teaches Harry the incredibly difficult Patronus charm, but Harry is able to produce a full-bodied Patronus to fight off the Dementors. Meanwhile, Black is reported to have been sighted in the village of Hogsmeade, close to Hogwarts. 

Harry is given a secret map by Fred and George Weasley, which reveals everyone inside the castle and its grounds. Harry uses it to sneak into Hogsmeade without permission. Hiding inside a pub, he overhears a conversation in which he learns that Black is actually his godfather, and that he killed his own best friend, Peter Pettigrew, while also betraying Harry's father, James, to Voldemort. 

Harry, Ron and Hermione visit Hagrid, and are surprised to find Ron's missing pet rat, Scabbers, hiding there. As they walk back to the castle with Scabbers, Ron is attacked by a large dog. The dog drags Ron into a secret tunnel and disappears, coming out on the other side, inside the Shrieking Shack in Hogsmeade. The dog is revealed to be Black in his Animagus form. 

Harry and Hermione reach the Shack, followed by Lupin, who spots them on Harry's map. Lupin disarms Harry, then explains why he believes Black to be innocent. Black claims that the crimes attributed to him were actually committed by Pettigrew, who escaped suspicion by faking his own death. Pettigrew is also an Animagus, and has been hiding as Ron's rat Scabbers this whole time. Harry suggests handing Pettigrew over to the Dementors. 

While walking back to the castle, the full moon suddenly emerges and Lupin, secretly a werewolf, starts transforming. Black turns into the dog to protect the others, and Pettigrew escapes amid the chaos. Harry, Hermione and Black are accosted by Dementors, and Black ends up being captured.

While Black is held captive inside a tower in Hogwarts, Dumbledore confirms with Harry and Hermione that he is indeed innocent. He instructs them to save Black, by going back in time and setting him free, before he is handed over to the Dementors. Using a Time Turner, which Hermione has had since the beginning of the year to get to all her classes, they travel back a few hours. Present-day Harry saves his past self, and the past versions of Hermione and Black from Dementors using a Patronus. He then allows Black to be captured by Snape, before using Hagrid's hippogriff, Buckbeak, to release him from the tower and escape. 

The next day, Lupin is forced to resign as his secret identity as a werewolf is now known to the school. Harry is upset at not spending more time with his godfather, Black, but Dumbledore asks him to take comfort in having saved his life. On the train journey back to London, Harry receives a letter from Black, who also sends a replacement pet owl for Ron.

Publication and reception

Pre-release history
Harry Potter and the Prisoner of Azkaban is the third book in the Harry Potter series. The first, Harry Potter and the Philosopher's Stone, was published by Bloomsbury on 26 June 1997 and the second, Harry Potter and the Chamber of Secrets, was published on 2 July 1998. Rowling started to write the Prisoner of Azkaban the day after she finished The Chamber of Secrets. Rowling said in 2004 that Prisoner of Azkaban was "the best writing experience I ever had...I was in a very comfortable place writing (number) three. Immediate financial worries were over, and press attention wasn't yet by any means excessive".

Critical reception
Gregory Maguire wrote a review in The New York Times for Prisoner of Azkaban: in it he said, "So far, in terms of plot, the books do nothing new, but they do it brilliantly...so far, so good." In a newspaper review in The New York Times, it was said that "'The Prisoner of Azkaban' may be the best 'Harry Potter' book yet". A reviewer for KidsReads said, "This crisply-paced fantasy will leave you hungry for the four additional Harry books that J.K. Rowling is working on. Harry's third year is a charm. Don't miss it." Kirkus Reviews did not give a starred review but said, "a properly pulse-pounding climax...The main characters and the continuing story both come along so smartly...that the book seems shorter than its page count: have readers clear their calendars if they are fans, or get out of the way if they are not." Martha V. Parravano also gave a positive review for The Horn Book Magazine, calling it "quite a good book." In addition, a Publishers Weekly review said, "Rowling's wit never flags, whether constructing the workings of the wizard world...or tossing off quick jokes...The Potter spell is holding strong".

However, Anthony Holden, who was one of the judges against Prisoner of Azkaban for the Whitbread Award, was negative about the book, saying that the characters are "all black-and-white", and the "story-lines are predictable, the suspense minimal, the sentimentality cloying every page".

In 2012 it was ranked number 12 on a list of the top 100 children's novels published by School Library Journal.

Awards
Harry Potter and the Prisoner of Azkaban won several awards, including the 1999 Booklist Editors' Choice Award, the 1999 Bram Stoker Award for Best Work for Young Readers, the 1999 FCBG Children's Book Award, the 1999 Whitbread Book of the Year for children's books, and the 2000 Locus Award for Best Fantasy Novel. It was also nominated for the 2000 Hugo Award for Best Novel, the first in the series nominated, but lost to A Deepness in the Sky. Prisoner of Azkaban additionally won the 2004 Indian Paintbrush Book Award and the 2004 Colorado Blue Spruce Young Adult Book Award. Additionally, it was named an American Library Association Notable Children's Book in 2000 as well as one of their Best Books for Young Adults. As with the previous two books in the series, Prisoner of Azkaban won the Nestlé Smarties Book Prize Gold Medal for children aged 9–11 and made the top of the New York Times Best Seller list. In both cases, it was the last in the series to do so. However, in the latter case, a Children's Best Sellers list was created just before the release of Harry Potter and the Goblet of Fire in July 2000 in order to free up more room on the original list.  In 2003, the novel was listed at number 24 on the BBC's survey The Big Read.

Sales
Prisoner of Azkaban sold more than 68,000 copies in the UK within three days of publication, which made it the fastest selling British book of the time. The sales total by 2012 is said by The Guardian to be 3,377,906.

Editions
Harry Potter and the Prisoner of Azkaban was released in hardcover in the UK on 8 July 1999 and in the US on 8 September. The British paperback edition was released on 1 April 2000, while the US paperback was released 1 October 2001.

Bloomsbury additionally released an adult edition with a different cover design to the original, in paperback on 10 July 2004 and in hardcover in October 2004. A hardcover special edition, featuring a green border and signature, was released on 8 July 1999. In May 2004, Bloomsbury released a Celebratory Edition, with a blue and purple border. On 1 November 2010, they released the 10th anniversary Signature edition illustrated by Clare Mellinsky and in July 2013 a new adult cover illustrated by Andrew Davidson, both these editions were designed by Webb & Webb Design Limited.

Beginning on 27 August 2013, Scholastic will release new covers for the paperback editions of Harry Potter in the United States to celebrate 15 years of the series. The covers were designed by the author and illustrator Kazu Kibuishi.

An illustrated version of Harry Potter and the Prisoner of Azkaban was released on 3 October 2017, and was illustrated by Jim Kay who illustrates the previous two instalments. This includes over 115 new illustrations and will be followed by Illustrated editions of the following 4 novels in the future. Jim Kay announced on 6 October 2022 that he would not be illustrating the final two Harry Potter books and that his last work, Harry Potter and the Half Blood Prince, would be released on 11 October 2022.

Adaptations

Film

The film version of Harry Potter and the Prisoner of Azkaban was released in 2004 and was directed by Alfonso Cuarón from a screenplay by Steve Kloves. The film débuted at number one at the box office and held that position for two weeks. It made a total of $796.7 million worldwide, which made it the second highest-grossing film of 2004 behind Shrek 2. However, among all eight entries in the Harry Potter franchise, Prisoner of Azkaban grossed the lowest; yet among critics and fans, the film is often cited as the best in the franchise – in large part due to Cuarón's stylistic influence. The film ranks at number 471 in Empire magazine's 2008 list of the 500 greatest movies of all time.

Video games

Three unique video games by different developers were released in 2004 by Electronic Arts, loosely based on the book:

References

External links

 

1999 children's books
1999 British novels
1999 fantasy novels
BILBY Award-winning works
Bloomsbury Publishing books
Bram Stoker Award for Best Work for Young Readers winners
British novels adapted into films
Costa Book Award-winning works
Fiction about shapeshifting
Fiction about size change
Fiction about prison escapes
Wrongful convictions in fiction
Fiction set in 1993
Fiction set in 1994
03
Novels about revenge
Novels about time travel
Scholastic Corporation books
Sequel novels
Werewolf novels
Children's fantasy novels